Greece hosted the 1997 World Championships in Athletics in the Olympic Stadium of Athens. The team consisted of 27 athletes (16 men and 11 women).

Medals

Results

See also
Greece at the IAAF World Championships in Athletics

References

1997
World Championships in Athletics
Nations at the 1997 World Championships in Athletics